Andrew Joseph Reck (October 29, 1927 - April 29, 2021) was an American philosopher and emeritus professor in the Department of Philosophy at Tulane University. He was a former president of the Metaphysical Society of America.

Life
He was born on October 29, 1927 in New Orleans to Andrew Gervais and Katie (Mangiaracina) Reck. He married Elizabeth (Betty) Lassiter Reck in 1987.

Books
 The New American Philosophers: An Exploration of Thought Since World War 2
 Speculative Philosophy: A Study of Its Nature, Types, and Uses

References

20th-century American philosophers
Philosophy academics
1927 births
2021 deaths
Presidents of the Metaphysical Society of America
Tulane University faculty
People from New Orleans